Phycita coronatella is a species of snout moth. It is found in Spain, France, Switzerland, on the Balkan Peninsula and in Turkey.

References

Moths described in 1845
Phycitini
Moths of Europe
Moths of Asia